Santomeri (Greek: Σαντομέρι) is a village in the municipal unit of Olenia, Achaea, Greece. It is located on the northern end of Mount Skollis, 5 km north of Portes,  18 km south of Kato Achaia and 32 km southwest of Patras. In 2011 Santomeri had a population of 164 for the village and 314 for the community, which includes the villages Ampelakia and Polylofo.

Population

History

Santomeri is named after Nicholas III of Saint Omer, a French baron of Thebes who gave his name to the castle Santameri and the nearby mountain, now known as Skollis. Venetians called it Edrolcamo?.

External links
 Santomeri GTP Travel Pages

See also

List of settlements in Achaea

References

Olenia
Populated places in Achaea